Androloma is a genus of moths of the family Noctuidae.

Species
 Androloma brannani (Stretch, 1872)
 Androloma disparata (H. Edwards, 1884)
 Androloma maccullochii (Kirby, 1837)

References
 Androloma at Markku Savela's Lepidoptera and Some Other Life Forms
 Natural History Museum Lepidoptera genus database

Agaristinae
Noctuoidea genera